Hong Kah MRT station is a future elevated Mass Rapid Transit (MRT) station on the Jurong Region line in Tengah, Singapore.

History
On 9 May 2018, LTA announced that Hong Kah station would be part of the proposed Jurong Region line (JRL). The station will be constructed as part of Phase 1, JRL (West), consisting of 10 stations between Choa Chu Kang, Boon Lay and Tawas, and is expected to be completed in 2027.

Contract J103 for the design and construction of Hong Kah Station and associated viaducts was awarded to Eng Lee Engineering Pte Ltd - Wai Fong Construction Pte Ltd Joint Venture (JV) at a sum of S$274.3 million. Construction will start in 2020, with completion in 2027. Contract J103 also includes the design and construction of Corporation station, and associated viaducts.

Initially expected to open in 2026, the restrictions on the construction due to the COVID-19 pandemic has led to delays in the JRL line completion, and the date was pushed to 2027.

Location
The station will be located within the future Tengah planning area.

References

Mass Rapid Transit (Singapore) stations
Proposed railway stations in Singapore
Railway stations scheduled to open in 2027